Staff Sergeant Salvador J. Lara (July 11, 1920 – September 1, 1945) was a U.S. Army veteran of World War II and recipient of the Medal of Honor. He was of Mexican-American descent.

Background
Lara was born in Riverside, California and raised in the neighborhood of Casa Blanca. He was the son of Juan and Isabel (Herrera) Lara, and worked in Riverside's citrus production before enlisting with the United States Army in Los Angeles on July 29, 1942. He never married, and had no children.

In May 1944 Lara was wounded in action during the Italian campaign while serving as the squad leader of a rifle squad. Despite his injuries, he continued to lead his squad taking multiple enemy strongholds.

Lara died on September 1, 1945, shortly after World War II ended, while serving with the 602d Ordnance Armament Maintenance Battalion in Europe.

Medal of Honor

Members of Lara's family received the Medal of Honor flag from Secretary of Defense Chuck Hagel in a March 19, 2014, ceremony when Lara was inducted into the Pentagon Hall of Heroes. They received the actual medal from President Barack Obama at the White House on March 18, 2014.

The award came through the Defense Authorization Act, which called for a review of Jewish and Hispanic veterans from World War II, the Korean War and the Vietnam War to ensure that no prejudice was shown to those deserving the Medal of Honor.

According to Lara's U.S. Army biography:Then-Pfc. Salvador Lara was bestowed the Medal of Honor to recognize his valorous actions in Aprilia, Italy, May 27–28, 1944. During the fight, May 27, he aggressively led his rifle squad in neutralizing multiple enemy strong points and inflicting large numbers of casualties on the enemy. The next morning, as his company resumed the attack, Lara sustained a severe leg wound, but did not stop to receive first aid. Lara continued his exemplary performance until he captured his objective.

Awards and decorations
Lara's awards include:

In Memoriam

Lara's burial monument is located at Plot F Row 17 Grave 33 of the Lorraine American Cemetery and Memorial in Saint-Avold, Moselle, France, a site administered by the American Battle Monuments Commission.

The SSgt. Salvador J. Lara Casa Blanca Library in Riverside, opened in 2003, is named in Lara's honor.

See also

 List of Medal of Honor recipients for World War II
 Hispanic Medal of Honor recipients
 Hispanic Americans in World War II
 Ysmael R. Villegas, also a World War II Medal of Honor recipient from Riverside
 Jesus S. Duran, a Vietnam War Medal of Honor recipient from Riverside

References

Further reading

External links
 American Battle Monuments Commission:Lorraine American Cemetery and Memorial
 

United States Army Medal of Honor recipients
World War II recipients of the Medal of Honor
United States Army non-commissioned officers
American people of Mexican descent
United States Army personnel killed in World War II
Burials at Lorraine American Cemetery and Memorial
People from Riverside, California
1920 births
1945 deaths